The 1899 Homestead Library & Athletic Club football team played professional football in 1899.  The team was affiliated with the Homestead Library & Athletic Club in Homestead, Pennsylvania, near Pittsburgh.

Organization
In 1898, William Chase Temple took over the Duquesne Country and Athletic Club, becoming the first individual team owner in professional football.  In 1900, most of the Duquesne players were hired by the Homestead Library & Athletic Club, by offering them higher salaries.

Bemus Pierce was hired by Homestead in mid-October 1899. He played and got hurt in the November game versus Duquesne C. & A.C. He returned to Homestead L.A.C. in 1900 and 1901, helping lead the teams to an undefeated 21–0 record.

Season schedule

 A game with the 10th Regiment was not played on October 21 because they failed to show up. Homestead refunded money to the spectators. 
 The Homestead team disbanded before Thanksgiving forcing the Latrobe A.A. (November 18), Crescent A.C. (November 22), Duquesne A.C. (November 25), Western University of Pennsylvania (November 30) to find new opponents.

See also
 1900 Homestead Library & Athletic Club football team
 1901 Homestead Library & Athletic Club football team

References

Homestead Library & Athletic Club
Homestead Library and Athletic Club football seasons
Homestead Library & Athletic Club football